Jeon Hee-sook (Hangul: 전희숙;  or  ; born 16 June 1984 in Seoul) is a South Korean foil fencer.

Jeon won the bronze medal in the foil team event at the 2006 World Fencing Championships after beating Poland in the bronze medal match. She accomplished this with her team mates Jung Gil-ok, Seo Mi-jung and Nam Hyun-hee.

In 2019, she won the gold medal in the women's foil event at the 2019 Asian Fencing Championships held in Chiba, Japan. She also won the silver medal in the women's team foil event.

Achievements
 2009 World Fencing Championships, individual foil
 2006 World Fencing Championships, team foil

References

External links
Profile on the 2009 Summer Universiade official website

1984 births
Living people
Fencers from Seoul
Korea National Sport University alumni
South Korean female foil fencers
Fencers at the 2012 Summer Olympics
Fencers at the 2016 Summer Olympics
Olympic fencers of South Korea
Olympic bronze medalists for South Korea
Olympic medalists in fencing
Medalists at the 2012 Summer Olympics
Fencers at the 2006 Asian Games
Fencers at the 2010 Asian Games
Fencers at the 2014 Asian Games
Fencers at the 2018 Asian Games
Asian Games gold medalists for South Korea
Asian Games bronze medalists for South Korea
Asian Games medalists in fencing
Medalists at the 2006 Asian Games
Medalists at the 2010 Asian Games
Medalists at the 2014 Asian Games
Medalists at the 2018 Asian Games
Universiade medalists in fencing
Universiade silver medalists for South Korea
Medalists at the 2011 Summer Universiade
Medalists at the 2009 Summer Universiade
Fencers at the 2020 Summer Olympics